Cynosura or Kynosoura was a settlement that existed before the Dorian conquest. It was united with three other such settlements (Pitane, Limnae, and Mesoa) by a common sacrifice to Artemis, and eventually coalesced into ancient Sparta. It is probable that Cynosura was in the southwest part of the city.

Its site is unlocated.

References

Populated places in ancient Laconia
Former populated places in Greece
Lost ancient cities and towns
Sparta